Soe Htut (born 29 March 1961) is a Burmese military officer and incumbent Minister for Home Affairs of Myanmar. Soe Htut is a career soldier, and currently holds the rank of Lieutenant General.

Early life and education 
Soe Htut was born to an army general, Brigadier General Lun Maung, and his wife Shwe Thet, in Mandalay, Burma (now Myanmar). He graduated from the 64th intake of the Officers Training School, Bahtoo, and received a bachelor's degree in physics, and a master's degree in defence studies.

Career 
Soe Htut served as the commander of Division 88 in Magwe. He then became a regional commander in July 2010. He had served as the commander of Eastern Central Command. While he became a major general, he serving as the commander of Central Command in Mandalay, in July 2015. He also served as the commander of the 101st Light Infantry Division in Pakokku.

In 2016, he was appointed Judge Advocate-General and promoted to lieutenant general. Soon after, he became the Chief of Military Security Affairs. He was nominated as minister for Home Affairs by Myanmar's commander-in-chief, Min Aung Hlaing, and appointed in March 2020, replacing Lieutenant General Kyaw Swe. According to analysts, Kyaw Swe's close relationship with Aung San Suu Kyi may have prompted the ministerial replacement. Prior to this appointment, Soe Htut had been appointed as the head of Office of Military Security Affairs in 2016.

Controversies
In July 2020, Justice for Myanmar published an exposé revealing Soe Htut's conflicts of interest in several government contracts awarded in Pa’O Self-Administered Zone to H Double H, a construction and engineering firm owned by his three sons. Soe Htut has also courted controversy for being part of a committee to investigate the 2020 Hpakant jade mine disaster, despite also being one of the largest individual shareholders of Myanma Economic Holdings Limited, a military corporation with significant jade mining interests.

Personal life 
Soe Htut is married to Nila Sein and has three sons, namely Min Than Htut, Soe Min Htut and Sithu Htut.

References 

People from Mandalay
1961 births
Burmese generals
Living people
Government ministers of Myanmar
Specially Designated Nationals and Blocked Persons List
Officers Training School, Bahtoo alumni
Individuals related to Myanmar sanctions